NCAA Division I men's lacrosse records listed here are primarily records compiled by the NCAA's Director of Statistics office.

Included in this consolidation are the NCAA men's Division I individual single-season and career leaders. Official NCAA men's lacrosse records did not begin until the 1971 season and are based on information submitted to the NCAA statistics service by institutions participating in the weekly statistics rankings, which started in 1996.  Career records include players who played at least three seasons (in a four-season career) or two (in a three-season career) in Division I during the era of official NCAA statistics. In statistical rankings, the rounding of percentages and/or averages may indicate ties where none exist. In these cases, the numerical order of the rankings is accurate.

Career leaders

Points

 [a] Granted a fifth season of eligibility
 [b] Lehigh records have Cameron with 308 career points, while NCAA record book shows Cameron with 307 career points.
 [c] Zach Greer's career points mark of 353 points is not officially recognized by the NCAA. Greer was granted a fifth season of eligibility and Bryant was considered a reclassifying institution that year. The NCAA lists Greer's career points as 285, though he scored 42 goals with 26 assists for 68 points in 2009, for a total of 353 career points.

Points per game

  [a] Not recognized by the NCAA

Goals

 [a] Zach Greer's career goals of 248 are not officially recognized by the NCAA, because Greer was granted a fifth season of eligibility and Bryant was considered a reclassifying institution. Greer scored 42 goals in 2009 for Bryant.

Source:

Goals per game

Assists

 [a] Lehigh record books show Cameron with 186 career assists while NCAA records have Cameron with 185.
 [b] Granted a fifth season of eligibility

Assists per game

Single-season leaders

Points

Points per game in one season

 [a] - Not recognized by the NCAA

Goals in one season

Goals per game in one season

 [a] Not recognized by the NCAA

Assists in one season

Assists per game

[a] Not recognized by the NCAA

Most Wins and National Titles by a program

The NCAA does not officially recognize lacrosse records prior to 1971, and the USILA does not maintain a database of lacrosse records. USILA era lacrosse records, nonetheless, have been included below. National titles include all NCAA, USILA, all divisions.

Current NCAA Division I lacrosse programs with 480 or more wins through 2022:

Winningest coaches

See also
NCAA Division I Men's Lacrosse Championship
United States Intercollegiate Lacrosse Association
Wingate Memorial Trophy
Division I men's lacrosse records

References
 Division I Men's Lacrosse Records through 2020

NCAA lacrosse
College sports records and statistics in the United States